Monocacy Creek may refer to:

Monocacy Creek (Lehigh River tributary), a tributary of the Lehigh River in Pennsylvania
Monocacy Creek (Schuylkill River), a tributary of the Schuylkill River in Pennsylvania

See also
Little Monocacy River, a tributary of the Potomac River in Maryland
 Monocacy (disambiguation)